Derby Crazy Love is a Canadian documentary film directed by Maya Gallus and Justine Pimlott of Red Queen Productions, and distributed by Women Make Movies. The film explores flat track roller derby, and its third-wave feminist empowerment.  It was initially released on November 14, 2013, at the Montreal International Documentary Festival.

Synopsis

Derby Crazy Love explores the evolution of the reemerging flat track roller derby, with a focus on its international sisterhood.   There are over 100 leagues in Canada and 1,400 worldwide.   Maya Gallus, one of the co-creators, explains, "[Derby is] female-dominated and player-owned and -operated, which already distinguishes it from any other sport." As the film begins, Montreal Roller Derby’s New Skids on the Block rematch against the UK’s London Rollergirls for a shot at the international WFTDA Championships, and New York City’s Gotham Girls Roller Derby (which includes derby superstars Suzy Hotrod and Bonnie Thunders) defends their title. This film captures how roller derby is part of punk’s counterculture, which tackles issues of masculinity, femininity, aggression, body image, queer identity, and gender norms. Each team consists of athletes with these various identities that have found a team where they belong. Gallus states, "Nobody’s making a big feminist point or a queer statement, [derby] just is inclusive." The sport is also a healthy outlet for of aggression, which is often denied to women. Montreal’s team leader, Smack Daddy, summarizes the spirit of derby: "The fact that you’re combining roller skating, which is like, ‘let’s hold hands and go to the roller-rink,’ with chicks beating on each other physically is like, fireworks."

Production

The film features music by Montreal’s Plastik Patrik et les Brutes, Lesbians on Ecstasy, and New York’s Kissy Kamikaze.

Awards

2014: Bay Street Film Festival, People’s Choice Award
2015: Sheffield Adventure Film Festival Best Women in Adventure Film, Bronze 
2015: Sheffield Adventure Film Festival, Special Jury Citation, Best Film
2015: Sheffield Adventure Film Festival Best Soundtrack, Gold

Festivals

Sheffield Adventure Film Festival
Sheffield Doc/Fest
RIDM Montreal Documentary Festival
Frameline International LGBT Film Festival (Frameline Film Festival)
Inside Out Toronto LGBT Film Festival (Inside Out Film and Video Festival)
Qdocs Portland
Northside Film Festival
This Human World Human Rights Festival Vienna
Salem Film Festival
DOXA Documentary Film Festival
 Women Make Waves, Taiwan
 SEOUL International Women's Film Festival, Korea
 Mardi Gras Film Festival
 Melbourne Queer Film Festival
 Fairy Tales International Queer Film Festival (Fairy Tales International Gay & Lesbian Film Festival
 Bay Street Film Festival
 Salt Spring Island Film Festival 
 Hamburg International Queer Film Festival
 Festival International du Film Lesbien Feminist, Paris
 Fringe Queer Film & Arts Fest, London, UK
 Dallas Video Festival
 Outburst Queer Arts Festival Belfast
 Mezipatra Queer Film Festival, Czech
 London Lesbian and Gay Film Festival, UK

Broadcasts
Global TV (Canada)

Reviews

"Falling in crazy love with derby…" Daily Xtra 
"Derby Crazy Love takes us to the heart of one of the last decade’s most thrilling sporting phenomena." Point of View 
"There is now a definitive roller derby doc." Cult Montreal 
"Derby Crazy Love goes straight to the heart of the emerging roller derby phenomenon, a vibrant and fun expression of feminist physicality…" The Rover 
"You’d be wise to expect the unexpected." She Does The City 
"Derby Crazy Love is an inspiration.  From the first frame it’s as intoxicating as the star players." Row Three

References

External links
 
 
 
 

Documentary films about women's sports
Canadian sports documentary films
2013 films
2013 documentary films
Roller derby films
2010s feminist films
Documentary films about feminism
2010s sports films
2010s English-language films
2010s Canadian films